Bradford Shane Shellhammer (born 1976) is an American entrepreneur and designer who co-founded the e-commerce companies Fab and Bezar. Shellhammer was an admissions counselor at Fashion Institute of Design & Merchandising Museum and part-time fashion and nightlife blogger. He was later a writer for JC Report, A&F Quarterly, and The Baltimore Sun. Shellhammer is the founding editor of Queerty and worked as a freelancer at Design Within Reach. As of 2018, Shellhammer serves as eBay's chief curation and merchandising officer.

Early life and education
Shellhammer was born in 1976 to Peg Kendall of Pasadena, Maryland, and Richard L. Shellhamer of Baltimore. He attended high school in Anne Arundel County and went on to study at Goucher College in Towson, Maryland, where he earned a bachelor's in communications and media studies in 1998. Later, Shellhammer received an associate degree in fashion design from Parsons School of Design.

Early career
In 1999, Shellhammer met Jason Goldberg, with whom he would later become business partners, at Roxy NYC. Goldberg offered him the opportunity to be his assistant at his company in Silicon Valley. The two traveled to San Francisco, where Goldberg was studying at the Stanford Graduate School of Business. Both were laid off four months later. Shellhammer remained in San Francisco and worked as an admissions counselor at the Fashion Institute of Design & Merchandising.

Shellhammer also blogged about his experiences in fashion and nightlife. He wrote for an online magazine called JC Report where he observed and commented on fashion trends, as well as for A&F Quarterly, and The Baltimore Sun. In August 2005, he assisted in the founding of Queerty, an online magazine about trends and lifestyle within the gay community. Shellhammer also worked part-time at Design Within Reach (DWR) as a freelancer. Between 2008 and 2009, he worked for several furniture and design stores in SoHo, Manhattan.

Involvement in Fab.com and subsequent projects
In 2010, Goldberg approached Shellhamer with the idea to launch Fabulis, a company that would serve as a social media network to provide travel advice and reviews to the young gay community. Shellhammer agreed to sign onto the project, and in February 2011, the company's name was shortened to Fab. During Shellhammer's tenure as chief design officer, Fab expanded rapidly and was valued at over $1 billion at its peak. By 2012, the site had over 10 million members and offered over seven million unique products.

Shellhammer left the company in November 2013 and launched Shellhammer.co, a consulting company for business design, digital merchandising, and branding. He remains a stakeholder in and advisor to Fab. In 2014, Shellhammer became the chief design officer for the retailer Backcountry.com. In 2015, he founded Bezar and served as the company's chief executive officer. He later sold the company to AHAlife due to difficulty raising outside investment. In 2016, Shellhammer was brought onto the executive team at eBay to serve as chief curation and merchandising officer.

Personal life
In March 2013, Shellhammer married partner Georgi Dimitrov Balinov, an investment banker at Barclays and a graduate of New York University. Actress and comedian Sandra Bernhard led the ceremony at New York's Russian Tea Room.

Shellhammer maintained a home in Sparrow Bush, New York. He is a noted art collector and was reported to have a number of Andy Warhol and Keith Haring pieces in his possession in 2017. Shellhammer's San Francisco home was featured in The Telegraph for its vibrant colors and "Warholian" interior design.

Awards and honors
Fast Company magazine named Shellhammer one of the "100 Most Creative People in Business." He has had several profiles in the same publication under the same category. Forbes called Shellhammer the "King of Quirk." In 2016, Goucher, Shellhammer's alma mater, recognized him as a distinguished alumnus.

See also
 LGBT culture in New York City
 List of LGBT people from New York City
 LGBT culture in San Francisco

References

External links
 
 
 2012 Interview with Lifehacker
 2013 Interview with Dezeen

Living people
Goucher College alumni
Parsons School of Design alumni
Fashion journalists
American gay writers
American LGBT businesspeople
American retail chief executives
American company founders
20th-century American non-fiction writers
21st-century American non-fiction writers
American male bloggers
American bloggers
American chief executives of fashion industry companies
American magazine editors
American online publication editors
Businesspeople from Baltimore
LGBT people from Maryland
American interior designers
1976 births
LGBT people from New York (state)
Businesspeople from New York City
Writers from Maryland
Writers from Manhattan
People from Anne Arundel County, Maryland
LGBT fashion designers
20th-century American male writers
21st-century LGBT people